A prison strike is an inmate strike or work stoppage that occurs inside a prison, generally to protest poor conditions or low wages for penal labor. Prison strikes may also include hunger strikes.

United States
At the national level,  declares "encouraging others to refuse to work, or to participate in a work stoppage" to be a "High Severity Level Prohibited Act" and authorizes solitary confinement for periods of up to a year for each violation.

The California Code of Regulations (CCR) states that "[p]articipation in a strike or work stoppage", "[r]efusal to perform work or participate in a program as ordered or assigned", and "[r]ecurring failure to meet work or program expectations within the inmate's abilities when lesser disciplinary methods failed to correct the misconduct" is "serious misconduct" under §3315(a)(3)(L), leading to gang affiliation under CCR §3000.

See also 

Prisoners' Rights
Strike Action

References 

Prisons
Civil disobedience